Gyanganga Dam, (also spelled as Dnyanganga), is an earthfill dam on Gyanganga river near Khamgaon, Buldhana district in the state of Maharashtra in India.

Specifications

Purpose
 Irrigation

See also
 Dams in Maharashtra
 List of reservoirs and dams in India

References

Dams in Buldhana district
Dams completed in 1971
1971 establishments in Maharashtra